Korada Subrahmanyam (born 1954) is a Sanskrit grammarian and scholar from India. He was a Professor of Sanskrit (CALTS), University of Hyderabad. Prof.Korada was born into a family of Vedic scholars hailing from the Godavari delta region, known as Konaseema. His areas of specialization include Paninian Grammar, Philosophy of Language, Translation, Vedas,Vedangas and Upanishads.The Professor is also well versed in Mahābhāṣya, Vākyapadīya, Laghumañjūṣā, ślokavārtikam and Tantravārtikam. In fact, he studied Astadasavidyasthanams, ie Vedas, Vedangas, Darsanas, Upavedas, and Puranas (Lectures are available on Youtube and Essays are available on ancient indianwisdom.com of Jijyasa Foundation, USA.

Education and career 
Prof.Subrahmanyam was introduced to Sanskrit by his father Korada Subbavadhani(1913–1985), a ghanapāṭhī and Sanskrit scholar himself. He memorized Amarakosha, a Sanskrit thesaurus at the age of five. After mastering Krishna Yajurveda and the Upanishads, he went on to study Vyākaraṇa under Sripada Lakshminarayana Sastry(Podagatlapalli, East Godavari) and Kompella Subbaraya Sastry(Narendrapuram, East Godavari) in a traditional manner. Dr.Korada also gained proficiency in Vedanta under the tutelage of Rani Narasimha Sastry(Narendrapuram EG Dist.) and Acarya Pullela Sriramacandrudu (Hyderabad) and Jyotisham under Chivukula Satyanarayana Murthy (Gopalapuram, EG Dist.). The professor also forayed into Mīmāṃsā, Nyāya, Vaiśeṣika, Yoga, Sānkhya, Sāmudrika, and Tantra gaining expertise through self-learning and interaction with scholars. . The professor is a rare phenomenon, who had his schooling in both Oriental(Gurukula) and Occidental (University) fashions, which has benefited the Sanskrit lovers at large.  

Post bachelor's, Dr.Korada pursued his Master's and Ph.D. in Sanskrit from Andhra University, Visakhapatnam. His Ph.D. dissertation titled Mahāvākyavicārah
( A Study of Discourse ) is considered to be a magnum opus in the field of Sanskrit Linguistics. Dr.Korada joined the University of Hyderabad as a faculty and retired in 2019 as a Professor. During his 31 years long tenure, around 30 students worked with him for their MPhil and Ph.D. degrees.

Research and publications 
Some of the books published by the scholar include (available on archive.com ):

 Mahavakyavicarah (Ph.D. dissertation) - deals with the Study of Discourse in different systems of Indian Philosophy
 Vakyapadiyam (Brahmakanda only - English Translation) - explicates the cryptic meaning of Bhartrhari
 Four Vrttis in Panini - is an elaborated study of Vrttis in Paniniya with the help of various commentaries
 Theories of Language: Oriental and Occidental – is a nutshell of ancient and modern linguistic theories
 Pramanas in Indian Philosophy - offers a panorama of Pramanas right from Vedas and Epics

References 

Living people
1954 births
20th-century Indian linguists
21st-century Indian linguists
Indian Sanskrit scholars